Idjaza or Ijazah  may refer to:
 Idjaza, is a certification for Quran recitation.
 Ijazah, is a license to transmit a subject,